KCEC-FM (104.5 FM, La Campesina 104.5 FM) is a radio station broadcasting a Regional Mexican format. Licensed to Wellton, Arizona, United States, and with a studio in Yuma, Arizona, it serves the Yuma area.  The station is owned by Farmworkers Educational Radio Network Inc.

External links

CEC-FM